David Murray McPherson (22 August 1872 – 24 July 1942) was a Scottish footballer who played as a wing half.

Career
Born in Kilmarnock, McPherson played club football for Kilmarnock and Rangers, and made one appearance for Scotland in 1892.

His older brother John was also a Kilmarnock and Rangers player (they played on opposite sides in the 1898 Scottish Cup Final) and a Scotland international, and several other family members were also involved in football (though not as many as claimed in some reports which erroneously connect his family to another set of sporting McPhersons from Kilmarnock).

See also
List of Scottish football families

References

1872 births
1942 deaths
Scottish footballers
Footballers from Kilmarnock
Scotland international footballers
Rangers F.C. players
Kilmarnock F.C. players
Scottish Football League players
Association football wing halves